Hawkspur Green is a hamlet in the Uttlesford district, in the county of Essex, England. It is located near the villages of Great Bardfield and Finchingfield. Hawkspur Green contains one listed building called Moor Hall (grade II listed). From 1936 to 1940 it was the site of the Q Camp, an experimental community.

References 

Hamlets in Essex
Uttlesford